Dodi Lukebakio Ngandoli (born 24 September 1997) is a Belgian footballer who plays as a right winger for Bundesliga club Hertha BSC and the Belgium national team.

Club career

Anderlecht
On 25 October 2015, Lukebakio made his professional debut in the 79th minute as a substitute for Youri Tielemans in a Belgian First Division A match against Club Brugge, which result in a 3–1 victory for Anderlecht. On 7 December 2015, Lukebakio signed a new five-year contract. Three days later, he made his first UEFA Europa League debut as a substitute for Imoh Ezekiel in the 66th minute of a 2–1 win against Qarabağ FK. On 29 January 2016, he played his first full match for Anderlecth, a 2–1 away win over Sint-Truden. On 28 February 2016, after coming on as a substitute for Alexander Büttner, he scored an equaliser in the 74th minute in a 3–3 draw against Standard Liège.

2016–17 season: Loan to Toulouse
On 31 August 2016, Lukebakio signed for French club Toulouse FC. On 8 January, he made his debut for Toulouse in the round of 64 of the Coupe de France, as a substitute, replacing Ola Toivonen in the 58th minute of a 2–1 home defeat against Olympique de Marseille. On 14 January, Lukebakio made his Ligue 1 debut as a substitute replacing Issiaga Sylla in the 56th minute of a 1–0 defeat against Nantes. Lukebakio ended his loan to Touluse with 5 appearences, all as a substitute.

2017–18 season: Loan to Sporting Charleroi
On 2 July 2017, Lukebakio was signed by Charleroi on a season-long loan deal. On 29 July, he made his debut for Charleroi in a Belgian First Division A match against Kortrijk, which result in a 1–0 home win for Charleroi. On 5 August, he scored two goals in a match against Royal Excel Mouscron, the match finished with a 5–2 away victory for Charleroi. On 5 November, he scored his third goal in the 71st minute of a 3–1 away win over Antwerp.

Watford
On 30 January 2018, it was announced that Lukebakio would be joining Watford on a four-and-a-half-year deal. On 10 February, he made his Premier League debut during Watford's 2–0 defeat away to West Ham United.

Loan to Fortuna Düsseldorf
On 23 July 2018, Lukebakio joined Fortuna Düsseldorf on a loan deal for the 2018–19 season. On 24 November 2018, Lukebakio became the first player in Bundesliga history to net three goals against Manuel Neuer in a 3–3 draw against
Bayern Munich. The following month, he again found the back of the net in a 2–1 win, as Düsseldorf handed the Bundesliga leaders Borussia Dortmund their first league defeat of the season.

Hertha BSC
On 1 August 2019, Lukebakio transferred to Hertha BSC. He scored Hertha's first goal of the 2019–20 Bundesliga season in the team's opening match against Bayern Munich; a 2–2 draw.

International career
Lukebakio was born in Belgium to parents of Congolese descent. Lukebakio made his debut for the DR Congo national football team in a friendly 1–0 loss to Kenya on 4 October 2016. He has since switched allegiance to represent the Belgium U21 side. In October 2020 he was called up the senior Belgium squad for the friendly against Ivory Coast and the UEFA Nations League matches against England and Iceland on 8, 11 and 14 October 2020, respectively.

Career statistics

Club

Honours

Individual
 Bundesliga Rookie of the Month: December 2018

See also
 List of association footballers who have been capped for two senior national teams

References

External links

 Profile at the Hertha BSC website
 
 

1997 births
Living people
Footballers from Brussels
Belgian footballers
Belgium under-21 international footballers
Belgium international footballers
Democratic Republic of the Congo footballers
Democratic Republic of the Congo international footballers
Belgian people of Democratic Republic of the Congo descent
Association football midfielders
Association football wingers
R.S.C. Anderlecht players
Toulouse FC players
Watford F.C. players
Fortuna Düsseldorf players
Hertha BSC players
VfL Wolfsburg players
Ligue 1 players
Championnat National 3 players
Premier League players
Bundesliga players
Belgian expatriate footballers
Expatriate footballers in France
Belgian expatriate sportspeople in France
Expatriate footballers in England
Belgian expatriate sportspeople in England
Expatriate footballers in Germany
Belgian expatriate sportspeople in Germany
Black Belgian sportspeople
Dual internationalists (football)
Belgian Pro League players